Rose Rappoport Moss (born 1937) is an American writer born in South Africa. She emigrated to America in 1961. She has published novels, short stories, words for music and nonfiction. In addition, she was a teacher at Wellesley College. Along with Barney Simon and Rose Zwi, she was one of the so-called Johannesburg group of writers. Her work has been analysed for its powerful use of language.

References

External links 
Rose Moss website
Interview with the Boston Globe  n

1937 births
Jewish American writers
Living people
South African emigrants to the United States
South African women novelists
South African women poets
South African women short story writers
South African short story writers
21st-century American Jews